Platfòm Pitit Desalin is a Haitian political party led by Jean-Charles Moïse. , the party has two seats in the Chamber of Deputies and one seat in the Senate. The party leader, Jean-Charles Moïse who resigned as Senator in order to run for president in the 2015 presidential election. He received 14.3% of popular votes and came in third place.

References

Political parties in Haiti
Haitian nationalism